Isabelle Spennato-Lamour (born 17 March 1965) is a French fencer. She competed in the women's individual and team foil events at the 1988 and 1992 Summer Olympics. She is married to sabre Olympic champion Jean-François Lamour. In March 2013 she was elected president of the French Fencing Federation.

References

External links
 

1965 births
Living people
French female foil fencers
Olympic fencers of France
Fencers at the 1988 Summer Olympics
Fencers at the 1992 Summer Olympics
Sportspeople from Lyon